Qingshan may refer to the following locations in China:

Qingshan District, Wuhan
Qingshan District, Baotou, Inner Mongolia
Qingshan Formation, geological formation in Shandong
Xichang Qingshan Airport, near Xichang, Sichuan

Towns 
Qingshan, Shandong, a township-level division of Wendeng

Written as ""
Qingshan, Baicheng, a township-level division of Taobei District, Baicheng, Jilin
Qingshan, Guangxi, a township-level division of Guangxi, Lipu County
Qingshan, Jiangsu, a township-level division of Jiangsu, Yizheng
Qingshan, Jinzhai County, a township-level division of Anhui Province
Qingshan, Henan, a township-level division of Henan, Luoshan County
Qingshan, Shiyan, a township-level division of Hubei, Yun County, Hubei

Townships 
Qingshan Township, Boli County, a township-level division of Heilongjiang
Qingshan Township, Dongzhi County, a township-level division of Anhui Province
Qingshan Township, Jiayin County, a township-level division of Heilongjiang
Qingshan Township, Jilin, a township-level division in Yushu City
Qingshan Township, Linkou County, a township-level division of Heilongjiang
Qingshan Township, Lu'an,  a township-level division Yu'an District, Anhui Province

Subdistricts
 Qingshan, Hengyang (青山街道), a subdistrict of Shigu District, Hengyang, Hunan.

See also
Aoyama (disambiguation), places in Japan with the kanji 
Castle Peak (disambiguation), places in Hong Kong